Monoptilota is a genus of snout moths. It was described by George Duryea Hulst in 1900. It contains only one species, the lima-bean vine borer moth (Monoptilota pergratialis), which is found in the central and south-eastern parts of the United States.

The wingspan is 21–23 mm. Adults are brownish gray with whitish scales on the edge and across the end of the forewings. These are marked with small black streaks and are black along the veins. The hindwings of the males are white, while those of the females are grayish. There are three generations per year in North Carolina.

The larvae have been recorded on Phaseolus lunatus, snap bean, Vigna unguiculata and Dahlia species. Young larvae feed on the leaves of their host. Older larvae bore into stems and hollow out cavities, resulting in galls. Silky frass tubes are attached to the entrance holes on the galls. The species overwinters in the prepupal stage on or near the soil surface. Larvae can be found from May to October.

References

Phycitinae
Monotypic moth genera
Moths of North America
Pyralidae genera
Taxa named by George Duryea Hulst